is a subway station on the Toei Shinjuku Line in Chūō, Tokyo, Japan, operated by Tokyo Metropolitan Bureau of Transportation (Toei). The station opened on December 21, 1978, and it is numbered "S-10".

Lines

Layout
Hamacho Station has a single underground island platform serving two tracks.

Platforms

History
The station opened on 21 December 1978.

Passenger statistics
In fiscal 2011, the station was used by an average of 21,426 passengers daily.

Surrounding area
The station is located underneath Hamachō Park bordering the Sumida River. The Shuto Expressway No. 6 Mukōjima Line runs to the east. The area is a mix of mid-rise office buildings and scattered apartment buildings. The Meiji-za theatre is a short walk to the west. Other points of interest include:
 SSP Co., Ltd. headquarters
 Kagome Co., Ltd. Tokyo headquarters
 Shin-Ōhashi and Kiyosubashi bridges 
 Chūō Municipal Comprehensive Sports Center
 Chūō Municipal Nihonbashi Junior High School
 Hisamatsu Police Station
 Tokyo Television Center
 Button Museum

Connecting bus service
Toei Bus: Hisamatsuchō
 Aki 26 for Kasai Station
 Edo Bus (Chūō City Community Bus): Hamachō-Eki (Meijiza-mae)
 North Loop for Chūō city hall

See also
 List of railway stations in Japan

References

External links

 

Stations of Tokyo Metropolitan Bureau of Transportation
Railway stations in Japan opened in 1978
Railway stations in Tokyo
Nihonbashi, Tokyo